Kevin Smith (born 1995), known professionally as Kojaque , is an Irish rapper and record producer from Cabra, Dublin. He is also a visual artist and filmmaker.

Early life
Smith grew up in Cabra, Dublin. He went to school in St Declans College. He studied fine art in Dublin Institute of Technology and in 2017 received the RHA Student Graduate Award.

Career
Kojaque released Deli Daydreams, a concept album about the life of a deli worker, in 2018. It was nominated for the Choice Music Prize.

In 2021, Kojaque released Town's Dead. For the week ending 2 July 2021, it was the best-selling album on vinyl in Ireland. It was nominated for the Choice Music Prize.

Discography
Albums

EPs
Deli Daydreams (2018)
Green Diesel (with Luka Palm) (2019)

References

External links
Official website
Kojaque on Soundcloud
Kojaque on YouTube

1995 births
20th-century Irish people
21st-century Irish people
Living people
Musicians from Dublin (city)
Irish rappers
Alumni of Dublin Institute of Technology
People from Cabra, Dublin